Bramcote is a village in the Borough of Broxtowe, Nottinghamshire, England.  It contains twelve listed buildings that are recorded in the National Heritage List for England.  Of these, one is listed at Grade II*, the middle of the three grades, and the others are at Grade II, the lowest grade.  Most of the listed buildings are houses and associated structures, and the others consist of a church, the tower of a demolished church, a public house, and a row of almshouses.


Key

Buildings

References

Citations

Sources

 

Lists of listed buildings in Nottinghamshire